Giovanni Domenic "John" Barilaro (born 14 November 1971) is a former Australian politician who served as the 18th deputy premier of New South Wales and the leader of the New South Wales division of the National Party from 2016 to 2021. He was the Minister for Regional New South Wales, Industry and Trade in the second Berejiklian ministry from April 2019, and a member of the New South Wales Legislative Assembly representing the electoral district of Monaro since 2011 until his resignation in October 2021.

Barilaro previously served as the Minister for Regional Development (later renamed Minister for Regional New South Wales), Minister for Small Business, and Minister for Skills in the first Berejiklian and second Baird governments, from October 2014 until March 2019; and as the Minister for Regional Tourism in the first Baird government. In October 2021, he announced his resignation as Deputy Premier, Leader of the National Party and member for Monaro, saying it was "the right time for me to hand the reins over".

He is also known for Barilaro v Shanks-Markovina, a defamation lawsuit bought against Jordan Shanks for Shanks' youtube channel friendlyjordies, and Google as the publisher of the videos, as well as referring Shanks and a producer to the NSW Police Fixated Persons Unit, causing the producer, Kristo Langker to be arrested on charges of stalking that were ultimately dismissed in March 2022. The defamation lawsuit resulted in Shanks making an apology to Barilaro in 2021 along with editing some parts of the videos, while Google was ordered to pay him $715,000 in damages.

His attempt at a post-political career as the New South Wales trade commissioner to the United States resulted in a political scandal for NSW Premier Dominic Perrottet, after a series of embarrassing disclosures over Barilaro's creation of the highly paid role prior to his departure from Parliament, and the role of NSW Government ministers and public servants in the process. That process saw the originally successful applicant fired from her public service job. An additional round of applications began, Barilaro was the second ranked candidate prior to discussions with his CV references. He ultimately won the job and had his position confirmed but the scandal erupted in the middle of 2022 and he quit prior to moving to New York. The issue was referred to the NSW Independent Commission Against Corruption, and minister Stuart Ayres resigned from his cabinet role over the matter. He attacked a cameraman in 2022, but in February 2023 he was found not guilty due to mental illness.

Early years and background
Barilaro was born in Queanbeyan to immigrant parents from Calabria, Italy. After leaving school he worked for his family's business, Ryleho, a business that manufactures energy-efficient timber windows and doors, eventually as manager. He has campaigned within his local community for a high school for the growing suburb of Jerrabomberra, and helped found the Queanbeyan Macedonia Football Club (soccer), before serving for eight years as its club president.

Political career

Early work 
Barilaro was elected as an independent councillor of Queanbeyan City Council in 2008 and served on the council until he ran for the National Party in the seat of Monaro at the 2011 state election. He won the seat from incumbent Labor Minister Steve Whan with an 8.2-point swing to the Nationals.

Following the resignation of Andrew Stoner in October 2014, Barilaro was appointed to the first Baird ministry as the Minister for Small Business and the Minister for Regional Tourism. Baird rearranged his ministry following the 2015 state election, and Barilaro was sworn in as the Minister for Regional Development, the Minister for Skills, and the Minister for Small Business in the second Baird government.

Deputy Premier 
On 15 November 2016, Barilaro was elected unopposed as leader of the National Party in New South Wales, following the resignation of Troy Grant. Following the resignation of Mike Baird and the election of Gladys Berejiklian as Leader of the New South Wales Liberal Party, Barilaro led The Nationals to form the Liberal-National coalition in the Berejiklian ministry that was sworn in on 23 January 2017.

On 1 December 2017, Barilaro called for Prime Minister Malcolm Turnbull to resign as a "Christmas gift" to Australians. Turnbull subsequently accused Barilaro of "trying to ingratiate himself" with radio presenter Alan Jones. Turnbull also stated he had called Barilaro and left a message after previous criticism, but had not heard back, and suggested Barilaro should have expressed his view to Turnbull personally, rather than "bagging [him] in the media". Several federal ministers, including Julie Bishop and Mathias Cormann were also critical of Barilaro, with Cormann stating: "He is not a federal member of parliament, I don't know him, I have never met him, it is a regrettable comment, it is uncalled for, it is wrong, I reject it".

Following the 2019 state election, Barilaro was sworn in as the Minister for Regional New South Wales, Industry and Trade in the second Berejiklian ministry, with effect from 2 April 2019.

In April 2020, Barilaro expressed anger at fellow Minister Don Harwin after revelations he had traveled to his Central Coast holiday house despite bans on non-essential travel. Barilaro, who led the government’s calls for 'city people to stay out of the regions' during the COVID-19 lockdowns, however, was accused of "gross hypocrisy" by members of his own government, after it was revealed he spent a weekend 'on the farm' building a cubby house with his daughter (a 7-bedroom French provincial estate). Following an investigation into the incident, NSW Police ruled Barilaro did not breach coronavirus restrictions by making the trip and in a statement Barilaro said he went to the farm to "feed chickens, mow lawns and tend to maintenance".

Eden-Monaro bid 
On 30 April 2020, Barilaro was considering stepping down from State politics to contest the federal seat of Eden-Monaro in its upcoming by-election, following Mike Kelly's immediate resignation from politics owing to personal and familial health issues, but later withdrew his interest. He attributed the decision to a lack of support from Deputy Prime Minister Michael McCormack, whom he accused of fearing him as a leadership rival. Barilaro then apologised for his actions. Barilaro sent minister Andrew Constance an abusive text message while Constance was deliberating running for the by-election. Constance claims Barilaro's message convinced him "politics was stuffed", and he decided not to run.

Later years of government 
In September 2020 Barilaro threatened to move the Nationals to the crossbench in opposition to the government's policy to protect koalas, while National ministers maintained their positions in cabinet. Premier Gladys Berejiklian rejected the offer and gave Nationals ministers an ultimatum to withdraw their threat or be fired. Barilaro subsequently backed down and kept his ministry, though the government later shelved the koala protection bill, viewed as a ‘win’ for the Nationals at the time, though a ‘regression’ for koala protection.

An effigy of Barilaro appeared at the 2021 Sydney Gay and Lesbian Mardi Gras, depicting him as sitting inside a barrel; a reference to criticisms of "pork barrelling". Barilaro had spoken favourably of being given the nickname "Pork Barilaro", saying that what is typically described as pork barrelling is "actually an investment".

On 24 November 2021, Barilaro delivered his valedictory speech in NSW Parliament in which he closed with "one piece of advice: Be kind to each other. If we have learned anything over the past two years it is to be kind to each other". He officially resigned on 31 December 2021.

Friendlyjordies legal cases 

From the latter half of 2020, YouTube comedian and political commentator Jordan Shanks, known online as friendlyjordies, published a series of videos criticising Barilaro for the 2019–20 bushfire season and accusing him of corruption. Barilaro publicly expressed offence at Shanks' mocking depictions, where Shanks likens Barilaro to Mario from the Super Mario video games and comments that Barilaro is "powered by spaghetti", citing Barilaro’s consistent annual victories at a Queanbeyan spaghetti-eating contest. Barilaro accused the depictions of "racist undertones". In May 2021, Barilaro lodged a defamation claim in the Federal Court against Shanks, as well as Google for refusing to delete the videos. Barilaro cited this case as one of the reasons for his resignation from parliament.

In June 2021, a friendlyjordies producer Kristo Langker was arrested by counter terrorism officers and charged with stalking Barilaro, prompted by Barilaro's complaints to the police; he pleaded not guilty. Police allege he followed Barilaro, repeatedly asking him why he was suing friendlyjordies. Video footage of the incident shows the producer attempting to return legal documents to Barilaro regarding the defamation suit.  The producer's lawyer, Mark Davis, states the video of the incident is not consistent with the police statement.  Several notable figures have used social media to accuse Barilaro of lying to the police regarding the statement. Former Australian prime minister Kevin Rudd criticised Barilaro for "asking counterterrorism police to round ... up" people he does not like, categorising the friendlyjordies incidents as typical investigative journalism that politicians expect to face. Others criticising the arrest include former Director of Public Prosecutions Nicholas Cowdery, politician Helen Dalton, journalist John Pilger, and Media Watch. In March 2022, police dropped all charges against Langker, and were ordered to pay his legal costs.

Barilaro settled his lawsuit against Shanks on 5 November 2021, with Shanks agreeing to apologise for the videos. Shanks was liable for $100,000 in legal costs in relation to an unsuccessful application to have the case heard by a jury, but Barilaro did not receive any money in the settlement. On 6 June 2022, Google was ordered to pay Barilaro $715,000.

Post-political career (2021–present)

Investment NSW appointment 
After leaving office, Barilaro was appointed to a trade commissioner position in New York by Investment NSW, a government agency within the NSW Department of Industry. Questions were raised about the propriety of this appointment and NSW Government inquiries were established.  Senior public servant Jenny West was due to be given the role, before her verbal offer was rescinded by the state government. On 30 June 2022, Barilaro announced he was withdrawing from his role as NSW Trade Commissioner to the Americas, stating that his position had become untenable, due to the intense media scrutiny that his appointment had received. His former chief of staff Mark Connell, gave evidence to the parliamentary inquiry on the matter that Barilaro had said prior to leaving Parliament "I've just come from a meeting with Dom (Perrottet) and Stuart (Ayres) regarding trade and we’re going to bring back the Agent General in London as well as a bunch of other postings around the world. This is it; this is the job for when I get the fuck out of this place." He was found not guilty due to mental illness.

It was later revealed that, in both the first and second round of recruitment, Barilaro was not the preferred candidate, and won the job in the second round only after his rankings were adjusted following discussions with work references that were eventually revealed to be Gary Barnes, a former senior public servant who reported to Barilaro when Barilaro was a minister, Arthur Sinodinos, who served as the Australian Ambassador to the United States and former NSW Premier Barry O'Farrell, after which chief executive of Investment NSW, Amy Brown, edited the selection panel report to elevate Barilaro to first ranked candidate in the final report published a week after he had signed his contract. The issue was referred to the NSW Independent Commission Against Corruption. Government Minister Stuart Ayres resigned from his cabinet role over the matter on 3 August 2022.

On 23 July 2022, Barilaro attacked a television cameraman outside a bar in Manly. The incident was filmed by others and NSW Police opened an investigation. In the days after the attack Barilaro complained about the investigation, saying he was breaking his silence over "being treated like a criminal". On 26 August, Barilaro was charged with assault and malicious damage over the attack. He appeared at Manly Local Court on 12 October and pled not guilty. The charges have since been dismissed on the grounds of Barilaro's poor mental health state.

On Monday, 8 August, Barilaro appeared in front of a NSW parliamentary inquiry. On the second day of questioning, Barilaro ceased to cooperate, citing mental health reasons. A separate inquiry chaired by former NSW public service commissioner Graeme Head based on the mandate by the NSW Premier Dominic Perrottet found that the hiring decision was not done at 'arm's length'. In response, Perrottet stated that the recruitment process was 'flawed' and that he is seeking legal advice on whether the matter should be referred to NSW ICAC. The NSW parliamentary inquiry published its interim report on 6 February 2023, concurring with the Head inquiry that the recruitment decision were not made at 'arm's length' and that the appointment had all the hallmarks of 'jobs for the boys' scheme.

Leaked audio recordings
On 10 March 2023, Friendlyjordies released a video on YouTube, wherein he played leaked audio recordings taken of Barilaro talking with colleagues prior to the 2021 Upper Hunter state by-election, where he admitted to pork barrelling over $100 million worth of election commitments in an effort to win the election. He also published a similar video featuring an extended version of the same conversation, in which Barilaro admitted he was purposefully "making foolish election commitments" to win the seat.

The recordings would not be reported on by any mainstream media outlet, with the exception of the small regional radio station, 2NM. Media Watch host Paul Barry opined that no outlets had covered the story due to the state laws of New South Wales which make it illegal to publish a recording of a private conversation without the person's consent.

Personal life
Barilaro's father, Domenico, died in early 2020. Barilaro's aunt, Maria Inzillo, and her husband, Damiani Nesci, died from COVID-19 in December 2020.

In October 2021, Barilaro announced his separation from his wife of 26 years, Deanna.  They had three daughters together.

In December 2021, it was revealed Barilaro was in a relationship with his former long-time media adviser and described 'uber-loyalist' Jennifer Lugsdin.

References

External links
National Party – John Barilaro, Member for Monaro
Queanbeyan City Council – Cr John Barilaro

|-

|-

|-

|-

|-

1971 births
Members of the New South Wales Legislative Assembly
National Party of Australia members of the Parliament of New South Wales
Living people
Place of birth missing (living people)
Australian politicians of Italian descent
21st-century Australian politicians
Deputy Premiers of New South Wales